The 1972 season was the Minnesota Vikings' 12th in the National Football League. It marked the return of Fran Tarkenton to the Vikings after he had been traded to the New York Giants in 1967. In return, Minnesota sent three players to the Giants (Norm Snead, Bob Grim and Vince Clements), plus first- and second-round draft picks. Tarkenton's return also resulted in Gary Cuozzo, who had been with the team since 1968, being traded to the St. Louis Cardinals in a deal that sent wide receiver John Gilliam to the Vikings along with second- and fourth-round draft picks in 1973. Cardinals coach Bob Hollway was familiar with Cuozzo, having served as Minnesota's defensive coordinator under Bud Grant prior to leaving for St. Louis in 1971.

The Vikings finished with a record of seven wins and seven losses, 4 games worse than their 11–3 record from 1971. This would be one of only two times during the 1970s in which the Vikings failed to reach the playoffs, as they would win the NFC Central six consecutive seasons (1973–1978) before posting a 7–9 record in 1979. The Vikings started the season with just one win in their first four games, including a surprising 19-17 loss to the lightly-regarded Cardinals in week four, when Gary Cuozzo bested his former team as Vikings kicker Fred Cox hit the upright on a potential game-winning field goal. The team recovered from their slow start, winning five of their next six to sit at 6–4. However, the Vikings would lose three of their final four games to finish the season at an even 7–7.

Offseason

1972 Draft

 The Vikings received New England's 1st round selection (10th overall), CB John Charles, and cash as compensation for free agent QB Joe Kapp.
 The Vikings traded their first-round selection (24th overall), 1973 second-round selection (40th overall), QB Norm Snead, WR Bob Grim and RB Vince Clements to the Giants in exchange for QB Fran Tarkenton.
 The Vikings traded QB Zeke Bratkowski to the Green Bay Packers in exchange for Green Bay's third-round selection (59th overall).
 The Vikings traded their third-round selection (76th overall), 1971 second- and sixth-round selections (50th and 154th overall) and OL Steve Smith to the Philadelphia Eagles in exchange for QB Norm Snead.
 The Vikings traded their fourth-round selection (102nd overall) and CB John Charles to the Denver Broncos in exchange for WR Al Denson.
 The Vikings traded their fifth-round selection (128th overall) to the Los Angeles Rams in exchange for CB Ted Provost.
 The Vikings originally chose 180th overall but passed allowing Miami to move up and Minnesota to choose 181st overall.

Roster

Preseason

Regular season

Schedule

Game summaries

Week 3: vs. Miami Dolphins
The Dolphins traveled to Metropolitan Stadium in Minnesota for a match against the Vikings in week 9. Miami trailed Minnesota for much of the game. In the first quarter, the Vikings scored a touchdown via a 56-yard pass from quarterback Fran Tarkenton to wide receiver John Gilliam. With no further scoring in the first or second quarters, the Vikings led 7–0 at halftime. As Tarkenton attempted another pass to Gilliam early in the third quarter, cornerback Tim Foley intercepted and returned the ball to Minnesota's 37-yard line. Dolphins kicker Garo Yepremian kicked a 51-yard field goal and later a 42-yard field goal with 5:23 left in the third quarter after Miami re-gained possession. The Vikings then executed an 80-yard, 13-play drive which consumed all time remaining in the third quarter.

As the fourth quarter started, Minnesota scored a touchdown via a 1-yard run by running back Bill Brown, with the score being 14–6. After the Dolphins re-gained possession, Vikings linebacker Roy Winston intercepted Bob Griese. However, the No-Name Defense stopped Minnesota's subsequent drive with two sacks on Tarkenton. Miami's next drive, which included a 22-yard double reverse pass from wide receiver Marlin Briscoe to tight end Jim Mandich, ended with a 51-yard field goal by Yepremian. The Dolphins defense then stalled the Vikings next drive and took possession at the Miami 41-yard line. After 39 seconds, 6 plays, and a penalty for roughing the passer, Miami scored a touchdown – a 3-yard pass from Grise to Mandich. The Dolphins thus took a 16–14 lead. With one minute and twenty-eight seconds left, the Vikings attempted to reach field goal range. With little time left, Tarkenton threw a Hail Mary pass at the Minnesota 28-yard line, but was intercepted by Dolphins defensive back Lloyd Mumphord. Miami won by a score of 16–14, sacking Tarkenton five times, and improved to 3–0.

Week 11: at Pittsburgh Steelers

Pittsburgh came into the game 5–0 at home for the season, while Minnesota was riding a four-game win streak. It was quite windy in the stadium at gametime, as the ball blew off the tee twice during the opening kickoff. Once it was kicked, the Vikings began with a good return to their own 45-yard line, but went three-and-out. They got the ball back quickly on the Steelers' opening drive, as John Fuqua fumbled the ball on a bad exchange, recovered by Carl Eller at the Pittsburgh 20. The possession led to a 24-yard field goal after Minnesota only gained three yards. The Vikings followed with a low kickoff due to the wind conditions, and Pittsburgh started again from their own 48, but punted without a first down. The Vikings got the game rolling in an unusual way, extending their possession when Ed Marinaro fumbled a catch and teammate John Gilliam ran it across the 50-yard line. Despite a good drive, the Vikings were held scoreless after failing to gain a foot on a fourth down attempt at the 8. The Steelers then punted again, and late in the first quarter got a turnover at the Vikings' 12 when Bill Brown fumbled. Franco Harris scored untouched on the next play.

The Vikings continued their miscues in the second quarter, as their possession stalled with penalties and the snap was bobbled on the punt, although punter Mike Eischeid performed a fantastic improvised punt while scrambling. It began raining at this point, and after a Steelers punt, the Vikings drove all the way to the 4-yard line, only to settle for a bobbled field goal attempt for a turnover. The Steelers gave it back on an interception by Charlie West, but a field goal attempt by the Vikings from 50 missed badly. The half ended with the Steelers holding a 7–3 lead despite the Vikings holding a 140–84 edge in total yards. 

The second half started with a Steelers punt, and then a Vikings punt which the Steelers fumbled at their own 47 after a good return. The Vikings recovered and drove to the 7-yard line but, incredibly, they again bobbled a field goal attempt and again failed to gain any points. On the following Steelers possession, they hit on a big play with a swing pass to Ron Shanklin, which went from their own 39 to the Vikings 19 and set up a field goal. The teams each traded punts twice, until the Vikings neared the goal line again on a 63-yard catch-and-run by John Gilliam. They finally found the end zone with the next play on a swing pass to tight end Stu Voigt, tying the score at 10–10 with about nine minutes left in the fourth quarter. 

The Steelers quickly responded with a 61-yard Franco Harris run to the 1-yard line, giving Harris 100-plus rushing yards for the fifth consecutive game. The Steelers scored with a QB sneak by Terry Bradshaw on the following play. The extra point was blocked, and the Steelers led 16–10. They quickly got the ball back, taking Minnesota's punt to the Vikings 39, but were held to a missed field goal attempt. The Vikings then took their last meaningful shot, but failed on fourth down at their own 29. The Steelers then sealed the game with a touchdown catch by Frank Lewis, making the final 23–10.

Standings

Awards, records, and honors

All-Pros
First team
OT Ron Yary (AP)

Second team
OT Ron Yary (NEA-2, PFWA-2)
DE Carl Eller (AP-2)
DT Alan Page (AP-2, NEA-2, PFWA-2)
S Paul Krause (AP-2)

Pro Bowlers
WR John Gilliam
OT Ron Yary
DT Alan Page
FS Paul Krause

League leaders
John Gilliam – Yards per reception (22.0)

Statistics

Team leaders

League rankings

References

Minnesota Vikings seasons
Minnesota
Minnesota Vikings